Zeeshan Khanzada is a Pakistani politician who is currently serving as a member of the Senate of Pakistan from the Khyber Pakhtunkhwa since March 2021. He belongs to Pakistan Tehreek-e-Insaf. Khanzada is from Sheikh Maltoon Town, Mardan District.

References

Living people
Year of birth missing (living people)
Pakistan Tehreek-e-Insaf politicians
People from Mardan District
Pakistani Senators 2021–2027